Gerald Halpin (15 June 1896 – 9 June 1944) was an Australian cyclist. He competed in the men's sprint event at the 1920 Summer Olympics. He won Australian half mile title and was selected in Australian team. Gerald died in Glebe NSW, Australia.

References

External links
 

1896 births
1944 deaths
Australian male cyclists
Olympic cyclists of Australia
Cyclists at the 1920 Summer Olympics
Cyclists from Sydney